Adolfin may refer to:
Adolfin, Lublin Voivodeship
Adolfin, Masovian Voivodeship